The West Second Street Residential Historic District is a historic district in Hastings, Minnesota, United States.  The district contains thirteen architecturally significant homes built between 1857 and 1890.

Norrish House
The Norrish House was built between 1857 and 1858 in an octagonal shape and features a cupola and a wraparound porch. The construction is of limestone that has been stuccoed over.

Thorne-Lowell House
The Thorne-Lowell was built in 1861 of limestone in the Italian Villa style and featuring a cupola.

Pringle House
The Pringle House was built in 1870 in the Italianate style, sided with clapboard and including features such as a multi-gabled roof, bracketed cornice, bay windows, portico, and a full front porch.

Strauss House
The Strauss House, built in 1875 in the Second Empire style, faced with stucco and topped with a mansard roof (Northeast Elevation).

References

External links

 Local Design Guideline Style Guide pertaining to the West Second Street Historic District

Buildings and structures in Hastings, Minnesota
Historic districts on the National Register of Historic Places in Minnesota
Houses on the National Register of Historic Places in Minnesota
Houses in Dakota County, Minnesota
National Register of Historic Places in Dakota County, Minnesota
1857 establishments in Minnesota Territory